Dr. Panjabrao Deshmukh Memorial Medical College or Bhausaheb Deshmukh Memorial Medical College is a medical college located in Amravati, Maharashtra. The institute has 150 undergraduate seats for MBBS. The institute is named after Panjabrao Deshmukh. The college is recognized by Medical Council of India and is affiliated to Maharashtra University of Health Sciences, Nashik.

Academics

The school has various academic departments, with specialized laboratories and research centers.

Departments

 Anatomy
 Anesthesiology
 Biochemistry
 Dermatology-Venereology-Leprology
 Otorhinolaryngology (ENT)
 Forensic Pathology
 Medicine
 Microbiology
 Obstetrics and Gynaecology
 Occupational Therapy
 Ophthalmology
 Orthopedics
 Pathology
 Pediatrics
 Pharmacology
 Physiology
 Pulmonology
 Preventive Medicine and Social Medicine
 Surgery
 Radiation Therapy and Oncology
 Radio Diagnosis
 Radiology

References

External links
 

Medical colleges in Maharashtra
Education in Amravati
Affiliates of Maharashtra University of Health Sciences
Educational institutions established in 1984
1984 establishments in Maharashtra